Jean-Claude-Républicain Arnoux (Le Cateau-Cambrésis  – 1866) was a French civil engineer known for his invention of the Arnoux system for articulating trains on tight curves. It opened on 6 June 1846.

Biography 
Jean-Claude-Républicain Arnoux was born at Le Cateau-Cambrésis in the Nord department of France on 16 December 1792. His father was a postmaster. In 1811 he entered the École polytechnique and became a lieutenant in the Artillery under the French First Empire, before being decommissioned on 16 July 1815.

Between 1845 and 1852 he built the rail line from Paris to Strasbourg, after doing scientific research at the École Centrale. In 1838 he published essays concerning his system for carriages on large curves. On 9 March 1841 he made a proposal for a railway from Paris to Meaux, although it was not enacted.

He is best known as the inventor of the Arnoux system, which was used on the first Ligne de Sceaux on 6 June 1846. This system used trains with articulated axles, such that the movements of the axles were guided by chains and pulleys, so that they could negotiate tight curves at high speed.

By an Order of 6 September 1844 he won the operator's concession for the Ligne de Sceaux for 50 years. Work started in the middle of 1845, under the direction and assistance of his two sons-in-law. Lalanne worked on the route, earthworks and infrastructure. He worked later to extend the route as far as Robinson in 1893 and managed the branches from Bourg-la-Reine and Palaiseau to Orsay. Alexis Dulong worked on procurement, for the track and stations. Arnoux's solution was not without its problems, and twenty years later it was replaced with a more standard solution.

According to the timetables, in the year 1868 it ran to Paris every hour on the hour from 6am to 10pm and from Paris to Sceaux hourly from 6.47am to 10.47pm. The price in first class was 75 centimes, in second class 75 centimes, and in third class 45 centimes. Parisians who wanted to enjoy the countryside used it to get to Bals de Sceaux and Guinguettes de Robinson.

Arnoux had previously provided diligences for the Paris - Orléans journey from 10 June 1843; he hadn't foreseen their redundancy. This operation was first used on the first French (and first continental European) line, opened on 30 June 1827 between Paris and Saint-Étienne and 1 March 1832 to Andrézieux.

Arnoux died in 1866.

Legacy 
In Bourg-la-Reine a road following the old route of the first Ligne de Sceaux is named after Arnoux.

See also 
 Arnoux System
 Ligne de Sceaux
 Anjubault

Notes

Sources 
 
 
 
 
 Revue générale des Chemins de Fer, 1895

References 

1792 births
1866 deaths
French railway mechanical engineers